The Journey is a 1982 role-playing game supplement for The Mechanoid Invasion published by Palladium Books.

Contents
The Journey features new equipment, vehicles, powers, weapons, creatures, and situations for both the human colonists of the planet Gideon and their Mechanoid invaders.

Reception
William A. Barton reviewed The Journey in The Space Gamer No. 59. Barton commented that "In short, just too many ideas and too many improbabilities are crammed into The Journey for it to really stand as a viable extension of its far-superior predecessor. Still if you did enjoy The Mechanoid Invasion and wish to add some of the new equipment, etc., to your continuing struggle on Gideon – or if a science fantasy quest through the pipelines of the mother ship actually appeals to you – then you might find The Journey worth your time to look into in spite of it all."

Review
Different Worlds #31

References

Role-playing game supplements introduced in 1982
Science fiction role-playing game supplements